Phillip J. Riveness (born December 14, 1947) is an American politician in the state of Minnesota. He served in the Minnesota House of Representatives and Senate.

Career
While in the Minnesota House of Representatives, Riveness served as Assistant Majority Leader.

He was unseated in November 1988 by Independent-Republican Joyce Henry. They had run against each other two years previous, with Henry winning by 355 votes this time.

In the 1992 Minnesota Senate elections, Riveness was challenged by Barbara Mattson.

References

Democratic Party members of the Minnesota House of Representatives
Democratic Party Minnesota state senators
People from Bloomington, Minnesota
People from Kittson County, Minnesota
Bemidji State University alumni
University of Minnesota alumni
1947 births
Living people